Faraj Guliyev (born Nakhchivan AR, Azerbaijan 22 December 1962) is a well-known politician. 
Faraj Guliyev is a leader and chairman of the nationalist opposition party – National Revival Movement Party. In 2013 and 2018 he was Presidential candidate.

Early life
Guliyev was born on 22 December 1962 in Ordubad, Nakhchivan Autonomous Republic of Azerbaijan.
He is author of over 5 books. 
Foreign languages: Turkish, Russian and German.

Political activity
In 1995, he was convicted and spent several years in prison as opposition leader. In 2002, he was pardoned.
In 2010 and 2015, Faraj Guliyev was elected as a deputy of the parliament as chairman of the National Revival Movement party.

He was a candidate in the Azerbaijani Presidential elections in 2013 and 2018.
He stated that Turkish films do not need to be voiced.
Deputy Ferec Guliyev suggested that "Azerbaijani soldiers should fight against the terrorist organization PKK together with the Turkish army".
Ferec Guliyev expressed some of the issues that have been discussed and desired in the Turkish World for many years and stated that "Turkish World relations should be transferred to the political and military field".

2010 election

2013 election

2015 election

2018 election

2020 election

International activity

National Revival Movement Party
National Revival Movement Party (Azerbaijani: Milli Dirçəliş Hərəkatı Partiyası) is a political party in Azerbaijan. The party's leader is Faraj Guliyev, who is well-known politician. At the 2010 parliamentary elections, it won 1 out of 125 seats. In the 2015 parliamentary elections, it won 1 out of 125 seats.

Honours and medals

National honours and medals

Foreign honours

References

External links
MDHP

1962 births
Living people
20th-century Azerbaijani politicians
Azerbaijani democracy activists
Members of the National Assembly (Azerbaijan)
People from Ordubad
People from Nakhchivan
Recipients of the Azerbaijan Democratic Republic 100th anniversary medal